Rupert Thomson, FRSL (born November 5, 1955) is an English writer. He is the author of thirteen critically acclaimed novels and an award-winning memoir. He has lived in many cities around the world, including Athens, Berlin, New York, Sydney, Los Angeles, Amsterdam and Rome. In 2010, after several years in Barcelona, he moved back to London. He has contributed to the Financial Times, the Guardian, the London Review of Books, Granta and the Independent.

Biography & Literary Career

Youth & Education 
Rupert Thomson was born in Eastbourne, East Sussex, on November 5, 1955 to Rodney Farquhar-Thomson, a War Disability Pensioner, and Wendy Gausden, a nurse. His mother died on a tennis court when he was eight From the age of ten, he attended Christ's Hospital, a charity boarding school that offers children from humble backgrounds a better education. While at Christ's Hospital, he began to write poetry. His early influences were Thomas Hardy and TS Eliot. When he was fifteen, he rode his bicycle 150 miles on a "pilgrimage" to Hardy country. He was also influenced by a series called Penguin Modern European Poets – in particular, Montale, Rilke, Yevtushenko, Pavese, and Zbigniew Herbert. In 1972 he was awarded an Exhibition to Sidney Sussex College, Cambridge to study Medieval History and Political Philosophy. While at Cambridge University, he published poems in several small magazines, including The Windless Orchard. He graduated as a Bachelor of Arts in 1976.

Early Travels (1976 – 1977) 
After leaving university, Thomson flew to New York. He has stated that there were cultural reasons behind choosing America as a destination, since it was linked with artists as diverse as David Bowie and Alexander Trocchi Thomson spent six weeks living in Hell's Kitchen with a 63 year-old alcoholic and his family.

Afterwards, he travelled throughout the United States, principally by Greyhound bus. He also visited Vancouver and the Canadian Rockies, and travelled through Mexico. Thomson returned to Eastbourne in November of that year and worked in the Birds Eye factory. In January 1977 he left again – this time for Athens.

Once in Athens, Thomson rented a flat on Iliados Street and made a living by teaching English. He began work on a novel. He met WH Auden's secretary, Alan Ansen, who read his poetry and gave him encouragement. Thomson completed a 160-page first draft of a novel, but it was never finished.

Working in London (1978 – 1982) 
In 1978 Thomson moved to London and found a job as a copywriter. He was employed by Robin Wight's Euro Advertising. Later, he worked for FCB (Foote, Cone and Belding). While working in advertising, he kept notebooks and wrote 50-word short stories.

After four years in advertising, he gave up his job, moved a friend into his South London council flat, and set off for Italy in his Vauxhall Viva. From now on, he would devote himself to writing.

Seeing the World (1982 – 2000) 
In November 1982, Thomson took a job as winter caretaker of a converted Tuscan farmhouse that belonged to Miriam Margolyes. In the Italian countryside that winter, he wrote the first draft of a book that would become Dreams of Leaving: There was no heating in the house, and I worked in the kitchen, huddled against a free-standing gas stove. I typed on sheets of yellow foolscap, using a maroon Olympia portable I had inherited from my last agency. I was disciplined about the hours I put in: I would start at three in the afternoon and finish at one in the morning. The routine felt natural, comfortable, even seductive.The following year, he moved to West Berlin, where he rented an apartment on Sanderstrasse in Kreuzberg and continued to work on the novel he had started in Italy. He was on the point of taking up a job as a cleaner in the Olympiastadion when his father died.

He returned to Eastbourne in February 1984. The seven months Thomson spent with his brothers in the house where he grew up would provide the inspiration for his award-winning 2010 memoir, This Party's Got to Stop.

At the end of the year he moved to New York, where he worked at the Strand Bookstore, running the outdoor bookstall in Bryant Park  In the summer of 1985 Thomson moved to Japan, inspired by his grandfather who lived there for more than thirty years. He spent several months in Tokyo, redrafting his first novel. By 1986, he was back in London.  

Dreams of Leaving was picked up by Liz Calder and published by Bloomsbury in June 1987. It prompted the New Statesman to say: "When someone writes as well as Thomson does, it's a wonder other people bother", while Nicholas Lezard of the Guardian called it "one of the most haunting, resonant and clever parables about England you'll ever read". One of Thomson's fan letters came from Budgie, the drummer of Souxsie and the Banshees.

Three months after publication, Thomson flew to Sydney. While there, he received a phone-call from a film production company in Los Angeles, optioning Dreams of Leaving. He spent two summers in West Hollywood, writing an adaptation of his novel. The film was never made, but he was paid the sum of $50,000 for the screenplay, which financed his second novel, The Five Gates of Hell. This was followed by four more novels – Air and Fire (1993), The Insult (1996), Soft (1998) and The Book of Revelation (1999).

In 1998, he and his girlfriend, Katharine Norbury, entered the world of IVF. Their daughter, Eva Rae, was born in 2000.

Up North (2000 – 2004) 
In the spring of 2000, Thomson moved to a village in Cheshire to be close to his father-in-law, who was dying of cancer. While up north, Thomson wrote in a caravan, which he towed into an orchard next to the cottage where he was living. He was working on the book that would become Divided Kingdom.

Following a review in the New York Times,  Thomson received more than a dozen faxes from film-makers and film producers all over the world, including William Friedkin, wanting to option The Book of Revelation . He sold the rights to Australian writer/director, Ana Kokkinos. The film of The Book of Revelation was released in 2006.

The Barcelona Years (2004 – 2010) 
In 2004, Thomson moved to Barcelona, renting a house in Sarrià. A year later, he married his long-term girlfriend, Katharine Norbury, in Las Vegas. While in Barcelona, he published two novels, Divided Kingdom (2005) and Death of a Murderer (2007), which was shortlisted for the Costa Novel of the Year. He also ventured into non-fiction for the first time with his memoir, This Party's Got to Stop (2010), which won the Writer's Guild Non-Fiction Book of the Year. In his final weeks in the city, he wrote the first draft of Barcelona Dreaming.

Return to London (2010) 

In 2010 the financial crash forced Thomson and his family to return to London. Three years later, in 2013, David Bowie selected The Insult as one of his 100 Must-Read Books of All Time. Thomson has stated that being chosen by Bowie felt like an affirmation: I'm not a writer who has had much luck with prizes, but as Lionel Shriver said to me the other day, when we were talking about not being celebrated: "That Bowie accolade, though. No one can take that away from you." She paused. "You can take that to your grave."That year, Thomson's ninth novel, Secrecy, received overwhelmingly positive reviews. Boyd Tonkin, in the Independent, wrote: "Thomson has merged the pulse and pace of a thumping narrative heartbeat with an eerie and visionary gift for mystery, puzzle, and surprise…Scene after scene trembles with breath-stopping tension on the edge of bliss or dread", while Stephanie Merritt called Thomson "a writer of exceptional skill, though his work has perhaps not been as widely celebrated as it deserves" and added "his finest novel to date: exquisitely crafted, and with the power to possess and unsettle the reader in equal measure".

Thomson's next novel, Katherine Carlyle (2015), was feted by writers and artists as diverse as Jonathan Lethem, Lionel Shriver, Samantha Morton, Richard Flanagan, Deborah Moggach, Anne Enright, James Salter, and KT Tunstall. "Katherine Carlyle is the strongest and most original novel I have read in a long time," Philip Pullman wrote. "It's a masterpiece."

In 2016, Thomson's short story, "To William Burroughs, from His Wife", was shortlisted for the Costa Short Story of the Year Award.  

Katherine Carlyle was followed by Never Anyone but You (2018) and NVK (2019), which Thomson published under the pseudonym Temple Drake.

Thomson has this to say about the creative process:It's a headlong plunge into the unknown each time, with no framework, no plan, no end in sight…I'm trying to pin down some kind of psychological truth. I'm after an undertow – the flow of something fresh and unexpected. There's no need to be afraid, or even wary. No one will ever see my first attempt. I have a number of metaphors for how this process feels. I'm a sculptor with a piece of marble. I'm a driver on a motorway at night who turns his headlights off. I'm an actor, but without an audience. I chip away at something formless. I can't seem to remember any of my lines. I take wrong turnings, scenic routes. I get lost. I crash. But somehow I make progress. The marble gradually resolves itself into a shape. My characters slowly come alive. When day dawns and the road appears, I'm never where I thought I would be. The journey is always unpredictable. There is always risk, exhilaration, mystery, and panic. There is also, hopefully, the discovery of something that feels both recognisable and new.
He has never won any prizes for his fiction, and is often referred to by literary critics as having been criminally overlooked.

In 2021, he released his book, "Barcelona Dreaming", a literary work he had been working on for over 10 years.

Works

Novels 

 1987 – Dreams of Leaving
 1991 – The Five Gates of Hell
 1993 – Air and Fire
 1996 – The Insult
 1998 – Soft
 1999 – The Book of Revelation
 2005 – Divided Kingdom
 2007 – Death of a Murderer
 2013 – Secrecy
 2015 – Katherine Carlyle
 2018 – Never Anyone but You
 2020 – NVK (as Temple Drake)
 2021 – Barcelona Dreaming
 2023 - Dartmouth Park

Memoir 
2010 –  This Party's Got to Stop

Short Stories 

 1988 – Look, The Monkey's Laughing
 1989 – Other Things
 2014 – To William Burroughs, from his Wife

Essays & Articles 

 2009 – The Lost Boy
 2009 – Call Me by My Proper Name (Granta 107) 
 2010 – Park Life (Granta 110) 
 2011 – Truman Capote: an introduction to In Cold Blood 
 2013 – A life in writing by Nicholas Wroe 
 2013 – “Fugitive Pieces”: Rupert Thomson on Gaetano Guilio Zumbo 
 2014 – Patrick Modiano: an appreciation of the winner of the Nobel Prize for Literature - 
 2015 – “In the Wilds of Industrial Russia for Research I Will Not Use”: Rupert Thomson on researching Katherine Carlyle
 2015 – James Salter: Write or Perish 
 2015 – Rupert Thomson: “My Fear of Becoming a Father”
 2015 – Rupert Thomson discusses Katherine Carlyle with Max Liu
 2016 – Rupert Thomson: On trauma, death, and the power of fiction versus non-fiction (Part One)
 2016 – Rupert Thomson discusses his latest novel, Katherine Carlyle (Part Two) 
 2018 – David Bowie: How my novel ended up on Bowie's Must-Read list
 2019 – Rupert Thomson: Books that made me
 2020 – Flannery O'Connor: I even mis-spell intellectual
 2020 – Rupert Thomson: Novels about Women on Their Own

Bibliography 

 Rupert Thomson – Critical Essays: foreword by Rupert Thomson, edited by Rebecca Pohl and Christoper Vardy

Awards and Distinctions 

 Air and Fire: Shortlisted for the 1994 Writer's Guild Novel of the Year
 The Insult: Shortlisted for the 1996 Guardian Fiction Prize and chosen by David Bowie as one of his 100 Must-Read Books of All Time
 Death of a Murderer: Shortlisted for the 2009 Costa Novel of the Year
 This Party's Got to Stop: Winner of the 2010 Writer's Guild Non-Fiction Book of the Year
 Elected Fellow of the Royal Society of Literature in 2015
 To Williams Burroughs, from his Wife: Shortlisted for the 2015 Costa Short Story of the Year
 Never Anyone but You: Shortlisted for the 2018 American Library in Paris Book Award

External links 

 2001 – Rupert Thomson interviewed by Andrew Lawless for Three Monkeys Online
 2006 – “The Dreamlife of Rupert Thomson” by James Hynes of the Boston Review
 2006 – Rupert Thomson interviewed by Maud Newton
 2006 – Rupert Thomson and Ana Kokkinos talk to SBS The Movie Show Online about the film of The Book of Revelation
 2010 – Waterstone's interview Rupert Thomson for This Party's Got to Stop
 2013 – World Book Night interview Rupert Thomson 
 2013 – Fiction Uncovered interview
 2014 – What Writers Must Do: “Love People” – Rupert Thomson on Yevgeny Yevtushenko
 2014 – From bestseller to bust: is this the end of an author's life?
 2015 – Rupert Thomson discusses Katherine Carlyle with Tobias Carroll for Vol 1 of Brooklyn
 2015 – Rupert Thomson talks about Katherine Carlyle with Gil Roth on The Virtual Memories Show 
 2018 – Rupert Thomson reads from and discusses Never Anyone but You live at Books and Books in Miami
 2018 – Rupert Thomson discusses Never Anyone but You at the Kansas City Public Library
 2019 – The Insult is discussed on The Bowie Book Club
 2020 – Rupert Thomson discusses Never Anyone but You with Left Bank Books
 2020 – Rupert Thomson, aka Temple Drake, talks to Forbidden Planet about NVK

References

 

20th-century British novelists
21st-century British novelists
Living people
People educated at Christ's Hospital
1955 births
Alumni of Sidney Sussex College, Cambridge
People from Eastbourne
British male novelists
Fellows of the Royal Society of Literature
20th-century British male writers
21st-century British male writers